A hollow way is a sunken lane. Holloway may refer to:

People
Holloway (surname)
Holloway Halstead Frost (1889–1935), American World War I Navy officer

Place names
United Kingdom
Holloway, London, inner-city district in the London Borough of Islington
Holloway Road, a road that bisects the district
HM Prison Holloway, originally a mixed population prison, but later a female-only prison. Closed in 2016
Holloway (ward), an electoral division of the London Borough of Islington
Lower Holloway, place in the London Borough of Islington
Upper Holloway, place in the London Borough of Islington
Holloway, Berkshire, a location
Holloway, Derbyshire, village in Derbyshire close to Crich
Holloway, Wiltshire

United States
Holloway, Michigan, former settlement in Lenawee County
Holloway, Minnesota, in Swift County
Holloway, Ohio, in Belmont County

Other uses
Holloway Press, New Zealand fine press publisher
The Holloways, London-based indie rock band
Holloway Field, baseball field in Brisbane, Australia
Royal Holloway, University of London, one of the constituent colleges of the University of London
Holloway Brothers (London), British building company specialising in restoration work
10 Holloway Circus, skyscraper in Birmingham, England

See also

Halloway
Hollowaya, a genus of tiger moth